Andrés Mauricio Copete Ceballos (born October 29, 1983) is a Colombian footballer who plays for Parrillas One.

Club career
He made his debut in Honduras for Victoria against Deportes Savio on 2 August 2008, scoring the winning goal.

References

1983 births
Living people
Sportspeople from Valle del Cauca Department
Colombian footballers
C.D. Victoria players
C.D. Olimpia players
F.C. Motagua players
Xelajú MC players
Llaneros F.C. players
Parrillas One players
Colombian expatriate footballers
Expatriate footballers in Honduras
Expatriate footballers in Guatemala
Liga Nacional de Fútbol Profesional de Honduras players
Association football forwards